The Esculapeus was a British automobile manufactured for one year only, 1902.  A "chainless" voiturette, it had a five-horsepower twin engine.  Befitting its name, the car was designed for doctors (Asclepius was the Roman God of medicine and healing), and came complete with a locker for their bags, as well as full weather protection.

References
 David Burgess Wise, The New Illustrated Encyclopedia of Automobiles

See also
 List of car manufacturers of the United Kingdom

Defunct motor vehicle manufacturers of the United Kingdom